The 2023 NCAA Division I Wrestling Championships took place from March 16–18, 2023, in Tulsa, Oklahoma at the BOK Center. The tournament is the 92nd NCAA Division I Wrestling Championship.

Team results 

 Note: Top 10 only (according to FloWrestling)
 (H): Team from hosting U.S. state

References 

Wrestling competitions